Berlin Airlift is the eponymous debut album by the American rock band Berlin Airlift. It was released in 1982 by Handshake Records (distributed by CBS). Handshake Records declared bankruptcy 6 weeks after the album was released, dooming the album. Over the Hill (I Love You) and Don't Stop Me from Crying were radio favorites in Boston.

Track listing
All songs by Rick Berlin.
"Airlift" – 12:52
"Teenage Terror" – 2:39
"It's You I Love" – 3:50
"Girl in the Moon" – 3:50
"Can I Fall in Love" – 4:50
"This Is Your Life" – 2:52
"Don't Stop Me from Crying" – 3:45
"Over The Hill (I Love You)" – 3:10
"My Heart Ain't Big Enough for You" – 4:40
"I Hate Everything But You" – 2:55

Credits
Rick Berlin – vocals
Steven Paul Perry – Guitar, vocals
Jane Balmond – Keyboards
Chet Cahill – Bass, Vocals
Joe Petruzelli – drums, percussion, Vocals
Paul McAlpine - Photography and Art Direction

References

1982 debut albums
Berlin Airlift (band) albums